"Your Imagination" is a song written by Brian Wilson, Joe Thomas and Steve Dahl for Brian Wilson's 1998 solo album Imagination. An alternate version of "Your Imagination" with slightly different lyrics and Steve Dahl singing lead was occasionally played in the late 1990s on Dahl's Chicago-based radio shows on WLUP-FM and WCKG.

Brian Wilson supplied the vocals on both lead and harmony through overdubbing. The lyrics refer obliquely to nostalgia for The Beach Boys ("another car running fast; another song on the beach," "I took a trip to the past"), while the arrangement references The Beatles' "Sgt. Pepper" with the piccolo trumpet in the chorus.

The Giant Records CD single release, on Giant 9280, included an a cappella version of the "Your Imagination" along with the album track "Happy Days."

"Your Imagination" was featured in the live setlist for Brian Wilson's European tour in 2011.

References

1998 singles
Brian Wilson songs
Songs written by Brian Wilson
Song recordings produced by Brian Wilson
1998 songs